The Carthage Pirates was a primary name of the  minor league baseball teams based in Carthage, Missouri from 1938 to 1941 and 1946 to 1951. Carthage won three league titles playing as members of the Arkansas-Missouri League from 1938 to 1940, the 1941 Western Association and the Kansas-Oklahoma-Missouri League from 1946 to 1951. Carthage hosted home minor league games at Carl Lewton Stadium.

History
Carthage was initially a Class D  level affiliate of the Pittsburgh Pirates that played in the Arkansas–Missouri League from 1938 to 1940. The Arkansas–Missouri League existed for only two full seasons, with the Pirates winning the league title each of those years. The league formally disbanded on July 1, 1940. When this occurred, the Pirates held a 10 1/2 game lead on first place in the league standings. The team then folded with the league.

The franchise then became the Class C level Carthage Browns in 1941 after the St. Joseph Ponies relocated to Carthage on June 3, 1941. They were an affiliate of the  St. Louis Browns, playing in the  Western Association.

From 1946 to 1948, the Carthage Cardinals were an affiliate of the St. Louis Cardinals playing in the Class D level Kansas-Oklahoma-Missouri League. The franchise remained in the league until 1951, becoming the Carthage Cubs, an affiliate of the Chicago Cubs. They won the league title in 1951.

The ballpark
Carthage teams played home minor league games at Carl Lewton Stadium. Sadly, this ballpark is closing as of February 2023. The Stadium's namesake was a local umpire and educator.

Notable alumni
Cloyd Boyer (1946)
Dennis Burns (1941)
Frank Mancuso (1941)
Bob Speake (1949)

Season–by–season

See also
 Carthage (minor league baseball) players
 Carthage Browns players
 Carthage Cardinals players

References

Baseball teams established in 1938
Sports clubs disestablished in 1951
Defunct baseball teams in Missouri
Pittsburgh Pirates minor league affiliates
Chicago Cubs minor league affiliates
St. Louis Cardinals minor league affiliates
St. Louis Browns minor league affiliates
1938 establishments in Missouri
1941 disestablishments in Missouri
Defunct minor league baseball teams
Jasper County, Missouri
Defunct Arkansas-Missouri League teams
Baseball teams disestablished in 1951